The history of the Jews in Transnistria is mainly connected to the history of the Jews in Moldova, the history of the Jews in Ukraine, the history of the Jews in Romania and the history of the Jews in the Soviet Union as well as to countries in several other neighboring areas.

Background
Transnistria, or Transdniestria, officially the Pridnestrovian Moldavian Republic, is a primarily unrecognised state that split off from Moldova after the dissolution of the USSR and mostly consists of a narrow strip of land between the river Dniester and the territory of Ukraine. Transnistria has been recognised only by 
3 other mostly non-recognised states: Abkhazia, Artsakh, and South Ossetia. The region is considered by the UN to be part of Moldova.

Related information

Jews in Moldova

The history of the Jews in Moldova reaches back several centuries. Bessarabian Jews have been living in the area for some time. Today, the Jewish community living in Moldova number less than 4,000 according to one estimate, while local estimates put the number at 15–20,000 Jews and their family members.

Jews in Romania

The history of the Jews in Romania concerns the Jews both of Romania and of Romanian origins, from their first mention on what is present-day Romanian territory. Jewish communities existed in Romanian territory in the 2nd century AD. Minimal until the 18th century, the size of the Jewish population increased after around 1850, and more especially after the establishment of Greater Romania in the aftermath of World War I. A diverse community, albeit an overwhelmingly urban one, Jews were a target of religious persecution and racism in Romanian society – from the late-19th century debate over the "Jewish Question" and the Jewish residents' right to citizenship, to the genocide carried out in the lands of Romania as part of the Holocaust. The latter, coupled with successive waves of aliyah, has accounted for a dramatic decrease in the overall size of Romania's present-day Jewish community.

Jews in Ukraine

The history of the Jews in Ukraine goes back over a thousand years. Jewish communities have existed in the territory of Ukraine from the time of Kievan Rus' (late 9th to mid-13th century) and developed many of the most distinctive modern Jewish theological and cultural traditions such as Hasidism. According to the World Jewish Congress, the Jewish community in Ukraine constitute the third biggest Jewish community in Europe and the fifth biggest in the world.

Jews in Russia

The history of the Jews in Russia and on areas historically connected with it goes back at least 1500 years. The presence of Jewish people in the European part of Russia can be traced to the 7th–14th centuries CE. Jews in Russia have historically constituted a large religious diaspora; the vast territories of the Russian Empire at one time hosted the largest population of Jews in the world. Within these territories the primarily Ashkenazi Jewish communities of many different areas flourished and developed many of modern Judaism's most distinctive theological and cultural traditions, while also facing periods of anti-Semitic discriminatory policies and persecutions. The largest group among Russian Jews are Ashkenazi Jews, but the community also includes a significant proportion of other non-Ashkenazi from other Jewish diaspora including Mountain Jews, Sephardic Jews, Crimean Karaites, Krymchaks, Bukharan Jews, and Georgian Jews.

Jews in Bessarabia

The history of the Jews in Bessarabia, a historical region in Eastern Europe, dates back hundreds of years. Jews are mentioned from very early in the Principality of Moldavia, but they did not represent a significant number. Their main activity in Moldavia was commerce, but they could not compete with Greeks and Armenians, who had knowledge of Levantine commerce and relationships.

References

Jewish
Transnistria
Transnistria
Jewish
Jewish
Bessarabian Jews
Transnistria